A neutral state, the United States entered the war on the Allied side in December 1941. The American government first became aware of the Holocaust in German-occupied Europe in 1942 and 1943. Following a report on the failure to assist the Jewish people by the Department of State, the War Refugee Board was created in 1944 to assist refugees from the Nazis. As one of the most powerful Allied states, the United States played a major role in the military defeat of Nazi Germany and the subsequent Nuremberg trials. The Holocaust saw increased awareness in the 1970s that instilled its prominence in the collective memory of the American people continuing to the present day. The United States has been criticized for taking insufficient action in response to the Jewish refugee crisis in the 1930s and the Holocaust during World War II.

Background 

In 1924, the Johnson-Reed Act was passed, limiting immigration to the United States. In July 1938, the United States initiated the Évian Conference to address the refugee crisis with the nations of Europe and the Americas, but no consensus could be reached between the countries. In the aftermath of Kristallnacht in November 1938, Gallup found that at the time, 94% of Americans disapproved of the mistreatment of Jews in Nazi Germany, but only 21% of Americans supported increasing Jewish immigration to the United States. Isolationism was the dominant foreign policy at the time, and the people of the United States generally opposed involvement in foreign affairs and they also opposed increased immigration. This fact has been attributed to economic concerns which resulted from the Great Depression and an antisemitic prejudice which was held by a sizable portion of the population.

Following Kristallnacht, Secretary of the Interior Harold L. Ickes proposed relocating European Jews to Alaska. The government had been seeking solutions to increase the development of Alaska, and its status as a territory would allow the refugees to circumvent immigration quotas. The plan, laid out in the Slattery Report, was opposed by Jews and non-Jews in the United States, and it was never adopted as a result. Another initiative which the United States took to try to help Jewish refugees was the introduction of the Wagner–Rogers Bill in 1938, which would have authorized 20,000 refugee children from Germany to enter the United States. The bill was highly controversial, and it never reached a vote in Congress.

In 1939, German Jewish citizens boarded the passenger ship St. Louis and traveled to Cuba in an attempt to escape Nazi persecution. Despite the fact that they had the paperwork which enabled them to enter Cuba, only 29 passengers were allowed to off board, including those passengers who had US visas. The United States intervened on behalf of the passengers in an attempt to persuade the Cuban government to permit them to enter Cuba, but the Cuban government broke off the negotiations. Neither the United States nor Canada permitted the passengers to enter as an exception to immigration laws, so the ship was forced to return to Europe where the passengers were off boarded in the United Kingdom, the Netherlands, Belgium, and France. Of the 907 passengers who were returned to Europe, 254 were killed in the Holocaust and one was killed in an air raid.

By the time the United States entered World War II, it had admitted more refugees from Nazism than any other country in the world. Approximately 1,000 unaccompanied Jewish children were admitted to the United States between 1934 and 1936.

Domestic response 

The prevalence of antisemitism in German society was widely known by the 1930s, but citizens of the United States were unaware that the Holocaust was taking place for the first year. Several individuals attempted to contact the government of the United States and other governments to inform them of the Holocaust after it began in 1941. In August 1942, Gerhart M. Riegner sent the Riegner Telegram to the United States and the United Kingdom, indicating a suspicion that Nazi Germany may attempt to kill the Jewish people of Europe. Suspicions of Nazi atrocities against the Jews were given credibility after Raczyński's Note was published in December 1942 and Witold's Report offered the first detailed report of the Holocaust in April 1943. The extent of the Holocaust was not known until after it concluded at the end of World War II.

In January 1944, Assistant Secretary of the Treasury Josiah E. DuBois Jr. authored a report detailing how certain officials within the Department of State had worked to prevent assistance to Jewish refugees and obscure information about the Holocaust. In response, President Roosevelt created the War Refugee Board as an independent agency to help Jewish refugees. From August 1944 to February 1946, 982 refugees from eighteen different countries were interned at Fort Ontario Emergency Refugee Shelter as Operation Safe Haven. American rescue efforts in the final year of World War II are credited as saving tens of thousands of lives.

While many American newspapers showed concern for the atrocities committed against European Jews, The New York Times gave it a low priority, and stories about Jews in Europe rarely appeared on the front page. News of Jewish rights as a whole was often relegated to lesser importance in the context of military campaigns, and the contradictory nature of reports coming out of Europe made reporting on the subject difficult. After it was reported that over two million Jews had been killed in Europe, We Will Never Die was written by Ben Hecht and performed in Madison Square Garden to spread awareness of the Holocaust. Subsequent performances took place across the United States in the summer of 1943, and over 100,000 Americans witnessed the pageant.

Many individuals and organizations in the United States contributed to refugee assistance and relief activities. Religious groups such as the Quakers and the Unitarians assisted in rescue efforts.

Strategic bombing and the Western European Campaign 

During the strategic bombing of Germany by the Allies in World War II, some Jewish leaders advocated the bombing of Auschwitz concentration camp. The United States and the United Kingdom developed the capacity to reach Auschwitz with strategic bombing in July 1944. The United States declined to bomb Auschwitz, citing technical and strategic concerns, including the insufficient accuracy of strategic bombing and the risk of prolonging the war by diverting resources away from military targets.

In rare cases, American prisoners of war were sent to concentration camps. Approximately 9,000 Jewish Americans were captured as prisoners of war, and while most were sent to prisoner-of-war camps, those that were identified as Jewish would be sent to concentration camps. American dog tags during World War II identified the religious beliefs of each soldier, and Jewish Americans were forced to decide if they should lie about their religion or carry their dog tags on missions at all. African American soldiers were also singled out for transfer to concentration camps.

The United States military freed the prisoners of the concentration camps in Western Germany in April and May 1945, including Buchenwald, Dachau,  Mittelbau-Dora, Flossenbürg, and Mauthausen concentration camps. The Ohrdruf facility of the Buchenwald concentration camp was the first to be discovered by American soldiers. Upon finding and liberating the camp, soldiers worked to feed the prisoners and treat them for illness. Generals Eisenhower, Bradley, and Patton arrived to inspect the site on April 12, and a documentation process began soon after. Journalist Edward R. Murrow arrived the same day to begin recording the facilities and broadcasting the findings.

Post-war 
As the end of World War II in Europe approached, the Allied powers debated the best response to the crimes of the Nazi Party's leadership. The Soviet Union advocated a show trial and the United Kingdom advocated summary execution, but the United States advocated a fair trial and an agreement was made to hold a trial founded on common law. The Nuremberg trials were held in 1945 and 1946 to this end, and Supreme Court justice Robert H. Jackson was selected as the chief prosecutor representing the United States. Following the trials of Nazi leadership, the Allied powers could not come to an agreement on trials for other individuals involved in the Holocaust, so the United States held the subsequent Nuremberg trials unilaterally between 1946 and 1949 through military tribunals. During these trials, the United States prosecuted many additional perpetrators, including Nazi doctors, Nazi judges, industrialists, and military officers.

In the immediate aftermath of World War II, reports and photographs of the Holocaust served to emphasize the evil of the Nazis in the American consciousness. The democratization of West Germany and the onset of the Cold War caused the Soviet Union to replace Germany as the primary example of evil and totalitarianism in American rhetoric. Attention toward the Holocaust briefly resurged in 1961 during the Eichmann trial in Israel, and this event is credited for establishing the association of the Holocaust with the Jewish people specifically. A Holocaust awareness movement led by Jewish activists developed in the 1970s, resulting in the establishment of the Holocaust as a major event in the American consciousness. The Holocaust has persisted in the collective memory of the American people into the 21st century, and it has also been cited as a rare example of a historical event that has become more prominent in society as time passes.

Dozens of Holocaust memorials and museums exist in the United States. According to a 2020 Pew Research Center report, 84% of American adults are able to accurately describe the Holocaust, 69% were able to identify which part of the 20th century the Holocaust occurred in, and 45% were able to correctly identify how many Jews were killed in the Holocaust.

See also

Germany–United States relations
Foreign policy of the Franklin D. Roosevelt administration
Nazi foreign policy debate
1933 anti-Nazi boycott
1933 Madison Square Garden protest
1939 Nazi rally at Madison Square Garden
Antisemitism in the United States
History of antisemitism in the United States
History of the Jews during World War II
History of the Jews in the United States
Racism in the United States
The U.S. and the Holocaust, a 2022 documentary film about the United States and the Holocaust which was produced by Ken Burns, written by Geoffrey Ward, and directed by Ken Burns with the assistance of Lynn Novick and Sarah Botstein

References

Bibliography